Clint Steven Oldenburg (born September 9, 1983) is a former American football offensive tackle. He was drafted by the New England Patriots in the fifth round of the 2007 NFL Draft. He played college football at Colorado State.

Oldenburg was also a member of the New York Jets, St. Louis Rams, Denver Broncos, Minnesota Vikings, Washington Redskins, Virginia Destroyers and Saskatchewan Roughriders. Following his playing career, he began working as a game designer at Electronic Arts on the Madden NFL video game series.

Early years
Oldenburg was born in Sheridan, Wyoming. He graduated from Campbell County High School in Gillette, Wyoming in 2002, where he was awarded the annual Milward L. Simpson Athletic Award.

Pre-Draft
Oldenburg measured in at 6'5" 300 pounds at the NFL Combine.

At his Pro Day, he ran a 5.26 40 yard dash (1.77 10 yard split) with a 4.74 20 yard shuttle and 8.19 3 cone time. He also had a 30" vertical and 8'5" broad jump.

Professional career
He was drafted in the 5th Round of the 2007 NFL Draft by the New England Patriots. After being cut, he signed with the New York Jets for the 2007 & 2008 seasons. In 2008, he also landed with the St. Louis Rams and Denver Broncos before going to the Minnesota Vikings in 2009 and Washington Redskins in 2010.

Washington Redskins
He was released from the Redskins roster on September 4, 2011.

Saskatchewan Roughriders
On April 19, 2012, Oldenburg was released by the Saskatchewan Roughriders of the Canadian Football League.

References

External links
 New England Patriots bio
 CBSSports.com

1983 births
Living people
People from Sheridan, Wyoming
People from Gillette, Wyoming
Players of American football from Wyoming
American football offensive tackles
Colorado State Rams football players
New England Patriots players
New York Jets players
St. Louis Rams players
Denver Broncos players
Minnesota Vikings players
Washington Redskins players
Virginia Destroyers players
Saskatchewan Roughriders players
American video game designers